, abbreviated to Kumadai (熊大), is a Japanese national university located in Kumamoto, Kumamoto Prefecture in the Kyushu region of Japan. It was established on May 31, 1949, at which time the following institutions were subsumed into it; Kumamoto Teachers College (established in 1874), Kumamoto Pharmaceutical College (1885), the Fifth High School (1887), Kumamoto Medical College (1896), and Kumamoto Technical College (1906).

Currently, the university has seven faculties and eight graduate schools with a total of around 10,000 Japanese students and 500 international students from Asia, North America, South America, Europe, Africa, and Oceania. It is involved in the Top Global University Project, selected by the Japanese Ministry of Education, Culture, Sports, Science and Technology (MEXT), which aims to improve education in Japanese universities in order to increase global recognition and compete with the rest of the world.

History
The university was chartered by the Showa government on May 31, 1949, under a new Japanese education system reforming older system, merging five institutions of higher education in the city of Kumamoto which includes Kumamoto Teachers College ( Kumamoto shihan gakkō) established in 1887, Kumamoto Pharmaceutical College ( Kumamoto yakugaku semmon gakkō) established in 1885, the Fifth High School ( Dai-go kōtō gakkō) established in 1887, Kumamoto Medical College ( Kumamoto ika daigaku) established in 1896 and Kumamoto Technical College ( Kumamoto kōtō kōgyō gakkō) established in 1897 though the precursor of the university was founded in 1925 as a prefectural university of Kumamoto and subsequently it was reorganized as a national university in 1929.

The hub of the university at the time of foundation was the Fifth High School, which was a center for higher learning in western Japan during the Meiji period and the university began with six departments, with an enrollment of about 1,100 students. In 1955 the Graduate School of Medicine was established at the university and other graduate schools were subsequently founded.

In 2004 Kumamoto University became a National University Corporation under the National University Corporation Law.

Although the university was founded during the Taishō period (1912–1926), it has earlier roots in Saishunkan established on September in 1756 as Han school of Kumamoto Domain and Banjien established on July in 1756 by Shigekata Hosokawa, who was a Japanese samurai daimyō of the Edo period.

Campuses 

The university has four campuses, two campuses in the Kurokami district, the others in the Honjo-kuhonji district and the Oe district respectively, in the city of Kumamoto.

Kurokami North Campus 
Both of Kurokami North and South Campuses are the main campus, which are located in the Kurokami district of Kumamoto at the foot of Mount Tatsuda.
 Location: 2-40-1, Kurokami, Chuo-ku, Kumamoto
 Departments: Faculty of Letters, Faculty of Education, Faculty of Law
 Graduate schools: Graduate School of Education, Graduate School of Social and Cultural Sciences, School of Law
 Centers and institutes: The Memorial Museum of The Fifth High School, Research Center for Higher Education etc.

Kurokami South Campus 
The headquarters building of the university is located in this campus.
 Location: 2-39-1, Kurokami, Chuo-ku, Kumamoto
 Departments: Faculty of Science, Faculty of Engineering
 Graduate schools: Graduate School of Science and Technology
 Centers and institutes: Institute of Pulsed Power Science, Magnesium Research Center etc.

Honjo-kuhonji Campus 
 Location: 1-1-1, Honjo, Chuo-ku, Kumamoto
 Department: Faculty of Medicine
 Graduate schools: Faculty of Life Sciences, Graduate School of Medical Sciences, Graduate School of Health Sciences
 Centers and institutes: Institute of Molecular Embryology and Genetics, Center for AIDS Research etc.

Oe Campus 
 Location: 5-1, Oehonmachi, Chuo-ku, Kumamoto
 Department: School of Pharmacy
 Graduate schools: Graduate School of Pharmaceutical Sciences, Graduate School of Health Sciences
 Centers and institutes: Institute of Resource Development and Analysis etc.

Organization
The university has about 10,000 students enrolled in its undergraduate and graduate programs. There are seven faculties, eight graduate schools and their affiliated centers and institutes. In addition, the university operates a kindergarten, an elementary school, a junior high school, and a school for disabled children.

Faculties

 Faculty of Letters
 Faculty of Education
 Faculty of Law
 Faculty of Science
 Faculty of Medicine
 School of Pharmacy
 Faculty of Engineering

Graduate schools

 Graduate School of Education
 Graduate School of Social and Cultural Sciences
 Graduate School of Science and Technology
 School of Law
 Faculty of Life Sciences
 Graduate School of Medical Sciences
 Graduate School of Pharmaceutical Sciences
 Graduate School of Health Sciences

Research Centers

 Center for Multimedia and Information Technologies
 Center for Globalization
 Research Center for Higher Education
 Center for Policy Studies
 The Memorial Museum of The Fifth High School
 Institute for e-Learning Development
 Center for Marine Environment Studies
 Magnesium Research Center
 Institute of Resource Development and Analysis
 Center for AIDS Research
 Environmental Safety Center
 Research Center for Buried Cultural Properties
 Institute of Molecular Embryology and Genetics
 Institute of Pulsed Power Science

Affiliated Centers, Institutes and Schools

 Priority Organization for Innovation and Excellence
 Kumamoto University Innovative Collaboration Organization (KICO)
 Organization for Globalization
 Organization for General Education
 Health Care Center
 Kumamoto University affiliated schools
 Eisei-Bunko Research Center

Notable people

Academics 
 Hiroaki Mitsuya, virologist famous for his role in discovery of the anti-HIV drug zidovudine (AZT)
   Yasuhiro Muramatsu, medical scientist, famous for advocator for the enhanced permeability and retention effect
   Kenichiro Aoki, earth scientist
   Chuhei Takashima, archaeologist
 Masazumi Harada, researcher of Minamata disease
   Takeshi Yamakawa, researcher in the area of Fuzzy logic, among other achievements helped Omron to become a leader in this field during the 1980s and 1990s
   Meng Yonggang, Tribologist, Director, State Key Laboratory of Tribology, Tsinghua University

Politics 
 Yasuyuki Eda, politician, House of Representatives member

Business 
 Yukinori Kuwano PhD, engineer, former president of Sanyo Electric Co., Ltd.
 Kazunobu Abe, businessman, CEO of Sakai Chemical Industry Co., Ltd.
 Kazuma Tateishi, founder of OMRON Corporation

Art 
 Takehiko Inoue, manga artist

Entertainment 
 Miyako Miyazaki, model, 4th runner up of Miss Universe 2003
 Keiko Saito, actress
 Yoshiko Miyazaki, actress

Literature 
 Akira Mitsuoka, author, winner of Naoki prize

Athletes 
 Rio Kamikaze, female Kickboxer
 Mr. Gannosuke, professional wrestler

References

External links

Kumamoto University website

 
Japanese national universities
Buildings and structures in Kumamoto
Universities and colleges in Kumamoto Prefecture
1925 establishments in Japan